Challenge Ramudu is a 1980 Telugu-language action film, produced by T. Prakash Rao under the Anil Productions banner and directed by T. L. V. Prasad. It stars N. T. Rama Rao, Jaya Prada and music composed by Chakravarthy.

Plot
Vijayaram (N. T. Rama Rao) is a captain of a ship who has a habit of making challenges and succeeding them. Once on a journey from Singapore to India, he meets a beautiful girl, Aruna (Jaya Prada), daughter of Justice Rajashekaram (Gummadi) when Raju (Nutan Prasad) friend of Vijay challenges him to make her fall in his love and over time they really like each other. After reaching India, one day, Vijay takes Aruna and her younger brother Madhu / Bunty (Master Purushotham) to the picnic where Bunty is mislaid. Next day a video film was found in front of their house, in which an unknown person threatening Rajashekaram kidnapping Bunty to acquit his gangster who is presently prosecuting in the court, but Rajashekaram refuses to do so. Meanwhile, Vijay gets a clue by spotting a painting in the video film and finds out that Bunty is located at Cochin and decides to go there. At the same time, Vijay's guardian Gopalam (Mikkilineni) reveals the past that his entire family has been slaughtered by a hardcore criminal James (Satyanarayana) and the tragic incident happened at the same place Cochin itself. Now Vijay takes up both the tasks as the challenge, lands at Cochin along with Raju & Aruna and learns that James himself is a kidnapper who changed his name into Raghuram. At last, Vijay safeguards Bunty and takes his revenge against James. Finally, the movie ends with the marriage of Vijayram & Aruna.

Cast

N. T. Rama Rao as Vijayaram
Jaya Prada as Aruna
Satyanarayana as Raghuram / James
Gummadi as Justice Raja Shekaram
Nutan Prasad as Raju 
Mikkilineni as Gopalam
Kanta Rao as Dr. Ranga Rao
Rallapalli as Thantha
Narra Venkateswara Rao as Gangulu
Chalapathi Rao as Police Officer 
Geetha as Prema
Jayamalini as item number
Pushpalatha as Subhadra
Tatineni Rajeswari as Lakshmi 
Satyakala as Suguna 
Master Ravi Shankar as Young Raju
Master Ramu as Young Vijay Ram
Master Purushotham as Madhu / Bunty

Soundtrack

The music for the film was composed by Chakravarthy. The song Pattuko Pattuko is a hit track which was remixed in Nandamuri Balakrishna's Okka Magadu (2008).  Music released by SAREGAMA Audio Company.

References

External links
 

Indian action films
Films scored by K. Chakravarthy
Films directed by T. L. V. Prasad
1980 action films
1980 films